Sydney Harry Cohen (May 7, 1906 – April 9, 1988) was a pitcher in Major League Baseball.

Career
Cohen was Jewish.  He was the brother of second baseman Andy Cohen. Cohen Stadium in El Paso, Texas, is named after the two brothers.

Cohen went to Alta Vista Elementary School. He then went to El Paso High School, where he played baseball and basketball, and was captain of the basketball teams that went to the state finals in his junior and senior years (1925 and 1926). He then attended the University of Alabama, and subsequently signed to play professional baseball in 1928 with the San Francisco Seals of the West Coast League.

He pitched for the Washington Senators from 1934 to 1937. In 1934, he gave up Babe Ruth's 708th home run, his last as a member of the New York Yankees. In 1937 when he had a 3.11 ERA in 33 games, his four saves were fourth in the American League, as were his 21 games finished. He managed in the minor leagues for many years afterwards he died in El Paso Texas at age 81 .

References

External links

1906 births
1988 deaths
American expatriate baseball players in Mexico
Baltimore Orioles (IL) players
Baseball players from Baltimore
Bisbee Bees players
Bisbee-Douglas Copper Kings players
Chattanooga Lookouts players
Dallas Rebels players
El Paso Texans players
Fort Worth Cats players
Hollywood Stars players
Indios de Ciudad Juárez (minor league) players
Jewish American baseball players
Jewish Major League Baseball players
Major League Baseball pitchers
Mexican League baseball pitchers
Minneapolis Millers (baseball) players
Minor league baseball managers
New Orleans Pelicans (baseball) players
Oakland Oaks (baseball) players
Phoenix Senators players
Portland Beavers players
SMU Mustangs baseball players
UTEP Miners baseball coaches
Washington Senators (1901–1960) players
20th-century American Jews